"The Sound of Sunshine" is a single by Michael Franti & Spearhead and also the title track from their album of the same name (2010). It was written by Franti, Jason Bowman and Carl Young and produced by Franti with additional production by Sly & Robbie. It was released as the album's second single on June 1, 2010 and was digitally released on June 8, 2010.

The song is featured in the films Yogi Bear, Soul Surfer, and Blue Crush 2.

Music video
The music video for "The Sound of Sunshine" was directed by Frank Borin and Michael Franti . It was filmed in Venice, California in late August 2010 and released on September 21, 2010.

In an interview with Spinner, Frantí said about the video, "We shot the video on Venice Beach in California because people from so many different walks of life come there to have a great time; to let go and let the sun shine in. These days there is much to worry about. The economy, climate change, war or just making it through a rough day. 'The Sound of Sunshine' is a song about the sun's ability to make any day better."

An alternate official music video was created for the song featuring Jovanotti (with lyrics partly in Italian and partly in English). The new version was filmed in the Lombardy's countryside around Pavia, Italy and released on June 28, 2011.

Charts and certifications

Peak positions

Certifications

References

External links
 The Sound Of Sunshine at VEVO
 The Sound Of Sunshine alternate (Italian & English) version at VEVO

2010 singles
Michael Franti songs
2010 songs
Capitol Records singles
Songs written by Michael Franti